RBMS may refer to:
Rare Books and Manuscripts Section
River Bend Middle School, Sterling, Virginia

Running_Brushy_Middle_School